Universities in Lublin, Poland:

Maria Curie-Skłodowska University
John Paul II Catholic University of Lublin
Lublin University of Technology
Medical University of Lublin